Raymond McKinnon (born 5 August 1970) is a Scottish football player and coach, and is currently the manager of Forfar Athletic.

An alumnus of St Saviour's Roman Catholic High School, as a player McKinnon was a midfielder for such clubs as Dundee United, Nottingham Forest, Aberdeen, Livingston, Raith Rovers and Montrose. He represented the Scotland under-21 team.

McKinnon began his managerial career in junior football with Lochee United before managing senior clubs Brechin City, Raith Rovers, Dundee United, Morton, Falkirk and Queen's Park.

Playing career
McKinnon was born in Dundee on 5 August 1970. He started his career with Dundee United, turning professional on 12 August 1986. He soon gained attention as one of the most promising young midfielders in Scottish football. He impressed Brian Clough enough to win a £750,000 move to Nottingham Forest in July 1992, but almost as quickly as he had arrived found himself out of first team contention, Clough deciding that his skilful passing was not what he wanted for his midfield. He left to join Aberdeen on 8 February 1994, costing the Dons £300,000.

He returned to Dundee United on 3 November 1995, for a fee of £200,000, where he famously scored a hat-trick of free-kicks in a 3–2 win over Kilmarnock at Rugby Park in February 1997. He remained at Tannadice Park until being released at the end of the 1997–98 season during which he had struggled to gain a first team place. In the close-season he attracted interest from Crystal Palace, as well as French sides Auxerre and Bordeaux, but joined Luton Town on 6 August. He left to join Livingston on 12 September 1999, and after an injury hit season and a trial with Wolverhampton Wanderers under Colin Lee, joined Raith Rovers on a short-term contract on 28 July 2000.

Raith were unable to meet his wage demands, so he left and began training with Ayr United. He joined Portadown in October 2000, playing one game. In need of first team football to regain his match fitness he joined Stirling Albion on trial on 27 October, playing in the match against Queen's Park at Hampden Park. He joined East Fife, originally as a triallist on 17 November, leaving on 25 January.

On 15 March 2001 he joined Torquay United on non-contract terms, but left just five days later without appearing in the first team after the re-emergence of a groin injury. He returned to Torquay as a trialist on 30 July 2001, but along with most of the many players Roy McFarland considered during the round of pre-season friendlies was released without earning a contract.

In November 2001 he joined Montrose as a trialist, making his debut in the 1–1 draw with Stirling Albion at Forthbank on 10 November and scoring two weeks later in the 2–1 win over East Fife. Although linked with a return to England to have another attempt at breaking back into full-time football, he signed a deal to stay with Montrose until the end of the season in December 2001. He remained with Montrose until joining Raith Rovers for a second time in January 2003.

Coaching career
McKinnon moved to Lochee United in 2004, before leaving in July 2005 to take up a player/coach position with Broughty Athletic. McKinnon returned as Lochee manager in 2006.

He was linked with the managerial posts at both Brechin City and Montrose in December 2008, with Lochee stating their desire that he stay until at least the end of their run in the Scottish FA Cup.

On 16 July, McKinnon was appointed the new Technical Development Officer of the Scottish Football Association. He replaced Mark McNally, who became assistant manager at Scottish First Division club Morton.

McKinnon was appointed manager of Scottish Second Division club Brechin City on 9 October 2012.

Raith Rovers
On 23 May 2015, it was confirmed that McKinnon had been appointed manager of Raith Rovers. McKinnon guided Raith to fourth place in the 2015–16 Scottish Championship, qualifying for the promotion playoffs. He resigned on 11 May, after entering discussions with Dundee United about their managerial vacancy.

Dundee United
On 12 May 2016, Dundee United announced that they had appointed McKinnon as their manager on a three-year contract. In his first season in charge, United won the 2017 Scottish Challenge Cup Final, beating St Mirren 2–1. They went on to finish third in the Championship and qualified for the promotion playoffs. They progressed to the final by beating Morton and Falkirk, but lost 1–0 to Hamilton in the final. United sacked McKinnon in October 2017, after losses to Livingston and Inverness left them in fourth place.

Morton
McKinnon was appointed manager of Scottish Championship club Greenock Morton on 30 May 2018, and he appointed long-term deputy Darren Taylor as his 'first team coach'. The first match of his reign as Morton manager was a 0–0 draw in a friendly away to Forfar Athletic.

On 31 August 2018, after holding a Morton training session in the morning, McKinnon agreed to take over at their Championship rivals Falkirk. Falkirk were later fined by the SPFL for breaching league rules in their recruitment of McKinnon and his assistant Darren Taylor. In the following October, on Falkirk's first visit to Cappielow with McKinnon in charge, Morton fans greeted McKinnon with "Judas" branded red card posters provided by the Greenock Telegraph newspaper.

Falkirk
McKinnon was appointed Falkirk manager on 31 August 2018. Under his management, Falkirk were relegated to the third tier of the Scottish leagues for the first time since 1980. McKinnon was sacked on 16 November 2019, with the team sitting fourth in League One.

Queen's Park 
McKinnon became manager of Queen's Park in January 2020. He became the first manager of Queen's Park since the 1980s to secure two wins in his first two matches in charge, and the team won 2020–21 Scottish League Two (and promotion to League One) under his management. McKinnon left the club after the 2020–21 season had ended.

Forfar Athletic 
On 10 November 2022, McKinnon was named as the new manager of Scottish League Two club Forfar Athletic on a rolling contract until 2025.

Career statistics

Playing

Managerial

Honours

Player 
 Scotland U21
 UEFA under-21 Euros: Bronze 1992
 Toulon Tournament: Bronze 1991

Manager 
 Lochee United
 East Region Super League : 2004–05, 2007–08
 Redwood Leisure Cup. : 2007–08
 DJ Laing League Cup : 2007–08
 Dundee United
Scottish Challenge Cup : 2016–17
 Queen's Park
Scottish League Two : 2020–21

Personal life
McKinnon opened a restaurant in Dundee in 2004.

References

External links 
 

1970 births
Aberdeen F.C. players
Ayr United F.C. players
Brechin City F.C. managers
Broughty Athletic F.C. players
Dundee United F.C. players
East Fife F.C. players
Living people
Livingston F.C. players
Lochee United F.C. managers
Lochee United F.C. players
Luton Town F.C. players
Montrose F.C. players
Nottingham Forest F.C. players
Portadown F.C. players
Premier League players
Raith Rovers F.C. managers
Raith Rovers F.C. players
Scotland under-21 international footballers
Scottish Football League managers
Scottish Football League players
Scottish football managers
Scottish footballers
Scottish Professional Football League managers
Footballers from Dundee
Stirling Albion F.C. players
Torquay United F.C. players
Dundee United F.C. managers
Greenock Morton F.C. managers
Association football midfielders
Falkirk F.C. managers
Scottish Junior Football Association managers
Queen's Park F.C. managers
Forfar Athletic F.C. managers